Alison Chartres has been the Australian High Commissioner to Kenya since August 10, 2017 and  is also accredited to Burundi, Rwanda, Somalia, Tanzania and Uganda, as well as the East African Community (EAC), the United Nations Environment Programme (UNEP), and the United Nations Human Settlements Programme (UN-Habitat).

References

Australian women ambassadors
High Commissioners of Australia to Kenya
High Commissioners of Australia to Tanzania
High Commissioners of Australia to Uganda
Year of birth missing (living people)
Living people